Falko Zandstra (born 27 December 1971) is a former Dutch speed skater. Because of his thin legs he was also called de Gespierde Spijker which translates to the Muscular Nail.

Biography
Zandstra was born in Heerenveen, Friesland. He was a natural talent who had his career peak at a very young age. In 1990 and 1991 he became junior world champion. In 1991 he won with a world record in the small combination. In his international debut year 1992 he became European Champion Allround and finished second in the World Allround Championships, after Roberto Sighel. In that season he also won the World Cup at the 1500 meters and a silver medal at the Winter Olympics in the 5000 meters. A year later, in 1993 he became World champion and European champion again.

From 1994 on, his career went downwards. At the 1994 Winter Olympics in Lillehammer he won the bronze medal in the 1500 meters and finished fourth in the 5000 and 10000 meters. He also won the 1500 meters World Cup again. In 1995 he finished second in the European championships. At the World championships that year, he fell during the 1500 meters when he threw his arm band (which is used to indicate in which lane a skater has started) over his own skate. Because of this he didn't qualify for the 10,000 meters.

For 49 days, from 23 January until 13 March 1993, Falko Zandstra was the leader in the Adelskalender.

After his career, Zandstra switched to marathon skating with little success and he quit skating in 1999. Today he runs his own company in roof and wall plating called Falko Dak & Wand in Heerenveen. He is married to former Dutch speed skater Ellen Linnenbank.

World records
In the course of his career, Zandstra skated nine world records, of which six were junior world records:

Source: SpeedSkatingStats.com

Personal records 

Source: www.isu.org

Tournament overview

 DNQ = Did not qualify for the final event
 NC = No classification
source:

Medals won

References

External links
 Falko Zandstra at SpeedSkatingStats.com
 Website of Falko Zandstra's company

1971 births
Dutch male speed skaters
Living people
Speed skaters at the 1992 Winter Olympics
Speed skaters at the 1994 Winter Olympics
Olympic speed skaters of the Netherlands
Sportspeople from Heerenveen
Olympic medalists in speed skating
Medalists at the 1992 Winter Olympics
Medalists at the 1994 Winter Olympics
Olympic silver medalists for the Netherlands
Olympic bronze medalists for the Netherlands
World Allround Speed Skating Championships medalists
Dutch speed skating coaches
Dutch sports coaches
21st-century Dutch people
20th-century Dutch people